Laura van Regenmortel (born 26 June 1992) is a Dutch professional racing cyclist, who most recently rode for UCI Women's Continental Team .

References

External links

1992 births
Living people
Dutch female cyclists
Place of birth missing (living people)
21st-century Dutch women